Sayyid (meaning 'sir', 'Lord', 'Master';;) is a surname of Muslims recognized as descendants of the Islamic prophet Muhammad through his grandsons, Hasan ibn Ali and Husayn ibn Ali, sons of Muhammad's daughter Fatima and his cousin and son-in-law Ali (Ali ibn Abi Talib).

In the early islamic period the title Al-Sayyid was applied on all the members of the of banu hashim, the tribe of Muhammad. Later on, the title was made specific to those of Hasani and Hussaini descent, primarily by the Fatimid Caliphs.

Female sayyids are given the titles sayyida, syeda, alawiyah, or sharifa. In some regions of the Islamic world, such as in Iraq, the descendants of Muhammad are given the title amīr or mīr, meaning "aristocrats", "commander", or "ruler".

In Shia Islam the son of a non Sayyid father and a Sayyida mother claim the title Mirza.

In Sunni Islam a person descended from Muhammad (either maternally or paternally) can only claim the title of Sayyid.

A few Arabic language experts state that it has its roots in the word al-asad , meaning "lion", probably because of the qualities of valour and leadership. The word is derived from the verb sāda, meaning to rule. The surname seyyid/sayyid (pl. sâda as in sādat Quraysh or the chiefs of Quraysh tribe) existed before Islam.

Hans Wehr Dictionary of Modern Written Arabic defines seyyid as master, chief, sovereign, or lord. It also denotes someone respected and of high status.

Although reliable statistics are unavailable, conservative estimates put the number of Sayyids in the tens of thousands.

In the Arab world, sayyid is the equivalent of the English word "liege lord" or "master" when referring to a descendant of Muhammad, as in Sayyid Ali Sultan. The word saeed (from the contracted form sayyidī, "my liege") is often used in Arabic.

History
The Sayyids are by definition a branch of Banu Hashim, which according to tradition traces its lineage to Adnan, and therefore directly descends from Ishmael (Ismaeyl), and collaterally descends from his paternal half-brother Isaac (Ishaaq), the sons of Abraham (Ibrahim) . The descent of Banu Hashim through an ancestor called Adnan to the legendary Ishmael and Abraham are traditional and religious beliefs, not historical facts.

Banū Hāshim (Arabic: بنو هاشم) is the clan of Muhammad, whose great-grandfather was Hashim ibn Abd Manaf, for whom the clan is named. Members of this clan are referred to as Hashemites. Descendants of Muhammad usually carry the titles Sayyid, Syed, Hashmi, Sayed or Sharif, or the Ashraf clan (synonymous to Ahl al-Bayt) . Today, two sovereign monarchs – Abdullah II of Jordan and Mohammed VI of Morocco – and the former royal family of Libya are also considered to be a part of Banu Hashim .

The Hashemites (Arabic: الهاشميون, Al-Hāshimīyūn; also House of Hashim) are the ruling royal family of Jordan. The House was also the royal family of Syria (1920), Hejaz (1916–1925) and Iraq (1921–1958). The family belongs to the Dhawu Awn, one of the branches of the Hasanid Sharifs of Mecca – also known as Hashemites – who ruled Mecca continuously from the 10th century until its conquest by the House of Saud in 1924. Their eponymous ancestor is Hashim ibn Abd Manaf, great-grandfather of Muhammad.

Traditionally, Islam has had a rich history of the veneration of relics, especially of those attributed to Muhammad. The most genuine prophetic relics are believed to be those housed in the Hirkai Serif Odasi (Chamber of the Holy Mantle) in Istanbul's Topkapı Palace.

Indication of descent
In the early period, other than general usage, the Arabs also allowed the terms Sayyid  to descendants from both Hasan ibn Ali and Husayn ibn Ali. .

Shia Sayyid scholars wear black turbans, while non-Sayyid Shia scholars wear other colors (most commonly white). Sunni The descendants of Ali and his other wives are called Alevi sayyid; they are titled Shah, Sain, Miya Fakir or Dewan. Those Sayyids who are Shia often include the following titles in their names to indicate the figure from whom they trace their descent:

Note: (For non-Arabic speakers) When transliterating Arabic words into English there are two approaches.
 1. The user may transliterate the word letter for letter (e.g., "الزيدي" becomes "a-l-z-ai-d-i").
 2. The user may transcribe the pronunciation of the word (e.g., "الزيدي" becomes "a-zz-ai-d-i"); in Arabic grammar, some consonants (n, r, s, sh, t and z) cancel the l (ل) from the word "the" al (ال) (see sun and moon letters). When the user sees the prefixes an, ar, as, ash, at, az, etc... this means the word is the transcription of the pronunciation.
 An i, wi (Arabic), or i, vi (Persian) ending could perhaps be translated by the English suffixes -ite or -ian. The suffix transforms a personal name or place name into the name of a group of people connected by lineage or place of birth. Hence Ahmad al-Hassani could be translated as Ahmad, the descendant of Hassan, and Ahmad al-Manami as Ahmad from the city of Manama. For further explanation, see Arabic names.

1Also, El-Husseini, Al-Husseini, Husseini, and Hussaini.

2Those who use the term Sayyid for all descendants of Ali ibn Abi Talib regard Allawis or Alavis as Sayyids. However, Allawis are not descendants of Muhammad, as they are descended from the children of Ali and the women he married after the death of Fatima, such as Umm ul-Banin (Fatima bint Hizam). Those who limit the term Sayyid to descendants of Muhammad through Fatima, Allawis/Alavis are the same how Sayyids.

Some Sayyids are Najeeb Al Tarfayn, meaning "Noble on both sides", which indicates that both of their parents are Sayyid.

Existence of descendants of Hasan al-Askari 
The existence of any descendant of Hasan al Askari is disputed by many people. Some genealogies of Middle Eastern and Central Asian families (mostly from Persia), East Africa (mostly in Somaliland and Ethiopia), Khorasan, Samarqand, and Bukhara show that Hasan al-Askari had a second son called Sayyid Ali Akbar, which indicates that al-Askari had children and substantiates the existence of Muhammad al Mahdi. Whether in fact al-Askari did have children is still disputed, perhaps because of the political conflicts between the followers of the Imamah and the leadership of the Abbasids and Ghulat Shiites who do not believe in Hasan al-Askari's Imamah. Another group of historians studying the pedigrees of some Central Asian saints' shejere (genealogy trees) believe that the Twelfth Imam was not the only son of Hasan al-Askari, and that the Eleventh Imam had two sons: Sayyid Muhammad (i.e., the Shia Mahdi) and Sayyid Ali Akbar.  According to the earliest reports as from official family tree documents and records , Imam Hasan al-Askari fathered seven children and was survived by six. The names of his biological children were: Imam Muhammad al-Mahdi, Musa, Ja’far, Ibrahim, Fatima, Ayesha, and ‘Ali, sometimes referred to as Akbar, Asghar or Abdullah.

Sayyid ‘Ali Akbar bin Imam Hasan al-Askari is Sultan Saadat (Sodot) who died in Termez. His burial place is located in the main mausoleum Sultan Saodat memorial complex in Termez. According to other old genealogical sources Sayyid Ali was the second son of Sayyid Imam Muhammad al Askari who is considered the elder brother of imam Hasan al-Askari

These Central Asian notable sayyid families have historical genealogical manuscripts that are confirmed with seals by many Naqibs, Muftis, Imams, Kadi Kuzzats, A’lams, Khans, and Emirs of those times. One descendant of Sayyid Ali Akbar was Saint Ishan (Eshon) Imlo of Bukhara. Ishan Imlo is called "saint of the last time" in Bukhara, as it is believed that after him there were no more saintsAsian Muslims generally revere him as the last of the saints. According to the source, Ishan Imlo died in 1162AH (1748–1749); his mausoleum (mazar) is in a cemetery in Bukhara. Notable descendants of Sayyid Ali Akbar are Sufi saints like Bahauddin Naqshband, descendant after eleven generations; Khwaja Khawand Mahmud known as Hazrat Ishaan, descendant after eighteen generations; the two brothers Sayyid ul Sadaat Sayyid Mir Jan and Sayyid ul Sadaat Mir Sayyid Mahmud Agha, maternal descendants of Hasan al Askari; qadi Qozi Sayyid Bahodirxon; and Sufi saints Tajuddin Muhammad Badruddin and Pir Baba.

In her book Pain and Grace: A Study of Two Mystical Writers of Eighteenth-Century Muslim India, Dr. Annemarie Schimmel writes:

Although Shiite historians generally reject the claim that Hasan al-Askari fathered children other than Muhammad al-Mahdi, Bab Mawlid Abi Muhammad al-Hasan writes, in the Shiite hadith book Usul al-Kafi:

Africa 

Muslim historians claimed that three of the descendants of Ali ibn Abu Talib migrated into Somalia and Ethiopia. The two Ashrafs migrated to Ethiopia and the remaining sayyid settled in Somalia.

Ethiopia 
Muslim historians and geologists claimed that one of the Ashrafs called Hajji Ali migrated into southern part of Ethiopia. After he migrated there, he had a son and named him Gan-Silte. His children then called by their father's name "Silte". according to the Silte tribesmen, the father of Hajji Aliyye (Hajji Ali) was Hajji Omar bin Osman, who was an Arab. He used to live in Hejaz, now part of Saudi Arabia. He migrated to Harar first, then settled in the southern part of Omnan which is now a part of Silte.

Middle East 
Men belonging to the Sayyid families or tribes in the Arab world used to wear white or ivory coloured daggers like jambiyas, khanjars or shibriyas to demarcate their nobility amongst other Arab men, although this custom has been restricted due to the local laws of the variously divided Arab countries.

Iraq 
The Sayyid families in Iraq are so numerous that there are books written especially to list the families and connect their trees. Some of these families are: the Alyassiri, Al Aqeeqi, Al-Nasrullah, Al-Wahab, Al-Hashimi,Al-Barznji, Al-Quraishi, Al-Marashi, Al-Witry, Al-Obaidi, Al-Samarai, Al-Zaidi, Al-A'araji, Al-Baka, Al-Hasani, Al-Hussaini, Al-Shahristani, Al-Qazwini Al-Qadri, Tabatabaei, Al- Alawi, Al-Ghawalib (Al-Ghalibi), Al-Musawi, Al-Awadi (not to be confused with the Al-Awadhi Huwala family), Al-Gharawi, Al-Sabzewari, Al-Shubber, Al-Hayali, Al-Kamaludeen and many others.

Iran 
Sayyids (in  Seyyed) are found in vast numbers in Iran. The Chief of "National Organization for Civil Registration" of Iran declared that more than 1 million of Iranians are Sayyid. The majority of Sayyids migrated to Iran from Arab lands predominantly in the 15th to 17th centuries during the Safavid era. The Safavids transformed the religious landscape of Iran by imposing Twelver Shiism on the populace. Since most of the population embraced Sunni Islam, and an educated version of Shiism was scarce in Iran at the time, Ismail imported a new group of Shia Ulama who predominantly were Sayyids from traditional Shiite centers of the Arabic-speaking lands, such as Jabal Amel (of southern Lebanon), Syria, Bahrain, and southern Iraq in order to create a state clergy. The Safavids offered them land and money in return for loyalty. These scholars taught Twelver Shiism, made it accessible to the population, and energetically encouraged conversion to Shiism.

During the reign of Shah Abbas the Great, the Safavids also imported to Iran more Arab Shias, predominantly Sayyids, built religious institutions for them, including many Madrasas (religious schools), and successfully persuaded them to participate in the government, which they had shunned in the past (following the Hidden imam doctrine).

Common Sayyid family surnames in Iran are Husseini, Mousavi, Kazemi, Razavi, Eshtehardian, Tabatabaei, Hashemi, Hassani, Jafari, Emami, Ahmadi, Zaidi, Imamzadeh, Sherazi, Kermani (kirmani), Shahidi, and Mahdavi.

Bahrain 
In Bahrain Sayyids are used to refer to great-grandchildren of Muhammed. Sayyids are funded every where and in vast populations although number are contradicted. Sayyids started living in Bahrain since the beging of the 8th century. The Bahrainis spurted, Imam Ali in his wars in the Camel, Siffin and Nahrawan, and several Bahraini men emerged from the leaders of the Commander of the Faithful including the companion Zayd ibn Suhan al-Abdi who was killed in the Battle of the Camel when he was fighting alongside the Commander of Imam Ali. And the companion Sa'sa'a bin Sohan Al Abdi who was the ambassador of the Commander of the Faithful to Mu`awiyah, and he and Mu`awiyah have many stories that historians have transmitted to us. Historians have called them this title because they agreed on a Thursday that they would die for the sake of the Commander of the Faithful. The tomb of Zayd ibn Suhan is still visited in Bahrain and is called by Bahrainis as Prince Zaid, as well as the tomb of the great companion Sa'sa'a bin Sohan Al Abdi who is buried in Bahrain.

Oman 

In Oman, Sayyid is used by members of the Al Said ruling royal family. The absolute ruler of the country retains the title Sultan with members of the royal family eligible for succession to the throne given the title Sheikh, these may also use the title Sayyid should they wish to, although as Sheikh supersedes this, it is not a widely used practice. Members of the extended family or members by marriage carry the title Sayyid or Sayyida for a female. Such titles in Oman are hereditary through paternal lineage or in some exceptional circumstances, such as an honorary title given by royal decree. Members of the Al Said family use the term Sayyid solely as a title and not as a means of indicating descent, as the Al Said royal family does not descend from Banu Hashim or from Imam Ali and instead descends from the Qahtanite Zahran tribe.

Yemen 

In Yemen the Sayyids are more generally known as sadah; they are also referred to as Hashemites. In terms of religious practice they are Shia, Sunni, and Sufi. Sayyid families in Yemen include the Rassids, the Qasimids, the Mutawakkilites, the Hamideddins, some Al-Zaidi of Ma'rib, Sana'a, and Sa'dah, the Ba 'Alawi sadah families in Hadhramaut, Mufadhal of Sana'a, Al-Shammam of Sa'dah, the Sufyan of Juban, and the Al-Jaylani of Juban.

Libya 

The Sayyids in Libya are Sunni, including the former royal family, which is originally Zaidi-Moroccan (also known as the Senussi family). The El-Barassa Family are Ashraf as claimed by the sons of Abdulsalam ben Meshish, a descendant of Hassan ibn Ali ibn Abi Talib.

South Asia 
Although people in South Asia claim Hashemite descent, genealogy family trees are studied to authenticate claims. In 1901 the total number of Sayyids in British India was counted as 100.

History of South Asian Sayyids 
Sayyids migrated many centuries ago from different parts of the Middle East and Central Asia (Turkestan) during the invasion of the Mongols, Ghaznavid dynasty, Delhi Sultanate, and Mughal Empire, encompassing a timespan of roughly until the late 19th century. Sayyids migrated to Sindh, Uch, Bihar Sharif, Sheikhpura ,  and Attock Khurd (Punjab) and settled there very early. Other early migrant Sayyids moved deep into the south to the Deccan sultanates located in the Deccan Plateau region in the time of the Bahmani Sultanate, and later Golkonda, Nizam Shahi of Ahmednagar, Asaf Jahi dynasty of Hyderabad, Bidar, and Berar. Several visited India as merchants or escaped from the Abbasid, Umayyad and Safavid. Their names appear in Indian history at the dissolution of the Mughal Empire, when the Sayyid brothers created and dethroned emperors at their will (1714–1720). The first Muslims appointed to the Council of India and the first appointed to the privy council were both Sayyids.

Afghanistan

In Afghanistan, Sayyids (Sadat) are recognized as an ethnic group.

On 13 March 2019, addressing the Sadat gathering at the presidential palace (Arg), President Ashraf Ghani said that he will issue a decree on the inclusion of Sadat ethnic group in new electronic national identity card (e-NIC).

President Ashraf Ghani decreed mentioning 'Sadat tribe' in the electronic national identity on 15 March 2019.

Sayyids of the north are generally located in Balkh and Kunduz; while in the east they can be found in Nangarhar. While most are Sunni Muslims, some in the Bamiyan province are to Shi'a.

India 
The total Sayyid population in India is 7,017,000, with the largest populations in Uttar Pradesh (1,493,000), Maharashtra (1,108,000), Karnataka (766,000), Andhra Pradesh (727,000), Rajasthan (497,000), Bihar (419,000), West Bengal (372,000), Madhya Pradesh (307,000), Gujarat (245,000), Tamil Nadu (206,000), and 25,000 in Jammu and Kashmir. Sayyids are also found in the north-eastern state of Assam, where they are locally also referred to as Dawans.

In India, Sayyids of Hadramawt (who originated mainly from the Arabian Peninsula and the Persian Gulf) gained widespread fame. There is a big community of Sayyids settled in and around the Nanganallur region in Chennai that trace their ancestry directly to the Sayyids of Iraq.

Traditional Sayyid families rarely marry outside their community, and emphasise marrying into Najeeb Altarfain (of Sayyid descent from both the mother's and father's side) families. This insistence on endogamy has begun to decline among the more urbanized families, with an increase in exogamy with other groups such as the Shaikh and Mughals.

Historically, the Sayyids of Uttar Pradesh were substantial landowners, often absentees, and this was especially the case with the Awadh taluqdars. In the urban townships, Sayyid families served as priests, teachers, and administrators with the British colonial authorities given the community a preference in recruitment. Though they account for less than 3% of Muslim population, they control a majority of economic resources. The community also has a very high literacy rate. The independence and partition of India in 1947 was traumatic for the community, with many families becoming divided and some moving to Pakistan. This was followed by the abolition of the zamindari system, where land was redistributed to those who till the land. Many Sayyids who remained on the land are now medium and small scale farmers, while in urban areas, there has been a shift towards modern occupations.

The Sayyids of Punjab belong to the Hasani (descendants of Hasan), Husaini (descendants of Husayn), Zaidi (descendants of Zayd ibn Ali, grandson of Husayn), Rizvi, (descendants of Ali al-Ridha), and Naqvi and their sub-caste Bukhari (descendants of Ali al-Hadi).

North India 
The earliest migration of Sayyids from Afghanistan to North India took place in 1032 when Gazi Saiyyed Salar Sahu (general and brother-in-law of Sultan Mahmud of Ghazni) and his son Ghazi Saiyyad Salar Masud established their military headquarters at Satrikh ( from Zaidpur) in the Barabanki district of Uttar Pradesh. They are considered to be the first Muslim settlers in North India. In 1033 Ghazi Saiyyad Salar Masud was killed at the battle of Bahraich, the location of his mazr. Ghazi Saiyyad Salar Masud had no children. His parental uncle Syed Maroofuddin Ghazi and his family lived in Tijara until 1857 before they migrated to Bhopal. Syed Ahmed Rizvi Kashmiri and Khan Bahadur Aga Syed Hussain were both Rizvi Sayyids through Aaqa Meer Sayyid Hussain Qomi Rizvi, whose sacred shrine is in the Zainageer Village of Sopore, Kashmir. Iraqi Sayyids or Iraqi biradri in Eastern Uttar Pradesh are descendants of Sayyid Masud Al Hussaini who was the direct descendant of Muhammad's grandson Hussain ibn Ali and came to India from Iraq during the reign of Sultan Muhammad bin Tughlaq in 1330 A.D. He settled with his seven sons and forty champions in Ghazipur (U.P.) as some of them (i.e., Syed Abu Bakr in Nonahra, Ghazipur) converted to Sunni Islam in the reign of Sultan Ibrahim Lodhi around 1517. His Shia descendants are now known as Sayyids of Ghazipur.

Sayyids of Syed nagli, or Said Nagli, or the Baquari Syeds had migrated from Termez (Present day Uzbekistan) during the Sultanate era. Sikandar Lodi was the ruler of Delhi when Mir Syed Mohammad al Hussain al Hussaini al Termezi Haji al Haramain came to India and settled at Syed Nagli. He was a Baquari Syed who drew his lineage from Muhammad al Baqir.

Perhaps the most important figure in the history of the Sayyid in Uttar Pradesh was Sayyid Basrullah Shustari, who moved from Mashad in Iran in 1549 and joined the court of the Mughal Emperor Akbar. Akbar appointed Shustari as his chief justice, who used his position to strengthen the status of the various Sayyid families. They were preferred in administrative posts and formed a privileged elite. When the Mughal Empire disintegrated, the Sayyid played an important role in the turbulent politics of the time. The new British colonial authorities that replaced the Mughals after the Battle of Buxar made a pragmatic decision to work with the various Sayyid jagirdars. Several Sayyid taluqdars in Awadh were substantial landowners under the British colonial regime, and many other Sayyid contributed to state administration. After the abolition of the zamindari system, many Sayyid zamindars (e.g. that of Ghazipur) had to leave their homes.

Uttar Pradesh

The ancestor of the Bārha Sayyids, Sayyid Abu'l Farah Al Hussaini Al Wasti, left his original home in Wasit, Iraq, with his twelve sons at the end of the 13th century and migrated to India, where he obtained four villages in Sirhind-Fategarh. By the 16th century Abu'l Farah's descendants had taken over Bārha villages in Muzaffarnagar.

The Sayyeds of Abdullapur Meerut are descendants of great saint Jalaluddin Surkh-Posh Bukhari. They had a large Jagirdara consisting of 52 villages.Abdullapur named after Syed Mir Abdulla Naqvi Al Bukhari, he built Kot Fort of this place in the 16th century, it was his main residence. Bukhari of Abdullapur are fractionate into Kannauji Bukhari and Jalal Bukhari. Kannauji's are descendants of Jalaludin Haider through Syed Mehboob Alam Naqvi-ul Bukhari Al-Maroof Shah Jewna or Shah Jewna son of warrior and chief advisor of Sikandar Lodi. Famous writer Syed Qudrat Naqvi Al Bukhari was born here later migrated to Pakistan after partition, his famous books are Ghalib kaun hai, Asaas-i-Urdu, Ghalib-i-sad rang, Seerat-un-Nabi, Hindi-Urdu lughat, Mutal'a-i-Abdul Haq, Lisani maqalaat.

The Sayyids of Bilgram are Hussaini Sayyids, who first migrated from Wasit, Iraq, in the 13th century. Their ancestor, Syed Mohammad Sughra, a Zaidi Sayyid of Iraq, arrived in India during the rule of Sultan Iltutmish. In 1217–18 the family conquered and settled in Bilgram.

A notable Sufi that belonged to a Sayyid family was Syed Salar Masud, from whom many of the Sayyid families of Awadh claim their lineage. Sayyids of Salon (Raebareli), Jarwal (Bahraich), Kintoor (Barabanki), and Zaidpur (Barabanki) were well-known Taluqadars (feudal lords) of Awadh province.

Sadaat also found in Kannauj trace their lineage from Husayn through Ali al-Hadi, a branch of Naqvi Bukhari. Famous Pir Syed Mehboob Alam Naqvi-ul Bukhari Al-Maroof Shah Jewna son of great warrior Syed Sadaruddin Shah Kabeer Naqvi (saint and also chief advisor) of Sikandar Lodi was also born in Kannauj and spent 66yrs of his life in kannauj later moved to Shah Jeewna. Makhdoom Jahaniya Mosque is still present in Shikana,Kannauj. Nawab Siddiq Hasan Khan was also from Kannauj, he is a Bukhari Naqvi Sayyed converted from Shi'a Islam to Sunni Islam in the early 1800s.

Bihar

There are different families of syeds in Bihar who belong to direct descendent of Imam Hasan and Imam Hussain. Mostly there are Hussaini (Rizvi, Zaidi, Baqri) along with Hasani (Malik , Quadri or Geelani). Sadaat are settle in different part of bihar including shia and sunni sects. They are mostly migrated to bihar from Iraq and Iran.
 
Sufi Saint Sharafuddin Maneri belongs to Banu hashim family of Imam Taj Faqih Rh. In Bihar, Sayyids were landlords, judges, barristers, intellectuals, civil servant, clerics, teachers, businessmen and farmers. Sufi Saint and a worrior Malik Ibrahim Bayu who conquered Bihar during the time of tughlaq is one the most famous personality in bihar.  Bihar's first prime minister Mohammad Yunus Nobel prize nominee and Padma shri winner Syed Hassan (educationist), Political Scientist  Abu Bakr Ahmad Haleem was the Pro-Vice Chancellor of Aligarh University and Karachi University , The great Abdul Bari (professor),Zaid Hamid Syed Zaid Zaman Hamid is a Pakistani far-right, Islamist political commentator and was included in 500 most influential muslims in world and Brigadier Malik Mokhtar Karim  are few names from Malik Sadaat of bihar.

Zaidi Sadaat of Bihar are the descendants of Sufi saint Syed Ahmad Jajneri and Syed Mohammed Jajneri. Syed Ahmad Jajneri migrated to India from Baghdad during the reign of Muhammad of Ghor and later migrated to Bihar. He was the direct descendant of Zayd ibn Ali who was the grandson of Husayn ibn Ali and therefore his descendants are called Husseini(Zaidi)Sadaat. His descendants are mostly settled in Bihar Sharif, Munger, Sheikhpura and Jamui region of Bihar.

Most prominent personalities of Sadaat of Bihar were from Desna, Bihar. For Example Syed Mohammed Saeed Raza, Abdul Qavi Desnavi and Sulaiman Nadvi. Desna's library, established in 1892, had thousands of old Persian and Urdu manuscripts. After the partition of India, during uncertain times of mass emigration to Pakistan, the books were donated to Khuda Bakhsh Khan Library in Patna, where a Desna section was established to house these treasures. Other famous personalities of Bihari Syed were Syed Sultan Ahmed, Syed Hasan Imam and Sir Imam Ali .

Gujarat
In Gujarat, most of the Sayyid families are descended from individuals invited by the Muslim rulers of Gujarat to serve as advisers and administrators, and were granted jagirs. During the period of Sultan Mahmud Begada (1458–1511), the sultan provided land to three Sayyid brothers and a grant to settle there after the victory of Pavagadh Fort. In 1484 the sultan conquered the fort on 21 November 1484 and transferred his capital to Champaner, which he completely rebuilt at the foothills of the Pavagadh Fort and named it Muhammadabad. During Mughal rule in Gujarat (1570–1750), the Sayyid held the majority of the civil and ecclesiastical posts. For example, the Sayyids of Thasra, Kheda district, were invited to serve as administrators and judges by the Mughal Emperor, Aurangzeb, and were provided land grants to settle there. They also comprised a significant portion of the Mughal army, and many are still found in old Muslim garrison towns like Ahmedabad. Many of the early Sufi saints that came to Gujarat belonged to Sayyid families, most of which came from Central Asia, Iran, Yemen, Oman, Basra, and Bahrain.

South India

Telangana 
Considerable Numbers of Sunni Razvi Sayyid Families (also locally spelt "Syed " as per the local Deccani dialect of Urdu), are found predominantly residing in and around Hyderabad & Wanaparthy.

The notable ancestor whose origins are traced back to Najaf in Iraq was Syed Hassan al-Najafi, a Hussaini Sayyid and 29th descendant of Imam Ali al-Rida through his grandson Musa al-Mubarraqa.

Syed Hassan al-Najafi moved to Hyderabad-Deccan with his family, initially settled in Wanaparthy Samsthanam, at the invitation of Nasir-ud-Daulah.

Having established a modern revenue administration system which was in dire need of able administrators, Asaf Jah IV Nasir-ud-Daulah appointed them Zamindars, Qazis & Muhtasibs of the organized districts. Known for their Knowledge, Wisdom, Piety and Justice were respected by folks and the royalties of all faiths.

Kerala
Thangals, a social group in among the Muslims of Kerala (most whom follow the Shafi'i madhab), are roughly equivalent to the Sayyids. The thangal families are numerous in Kerala. Most members of the community practices endogamy and some are considered as saints. Thangal families have many gradations of status on social and economic scale. Influential of the thangals generally come from prominent business families. They usually exercise their influence through commerce and politics.

Tamil Nadu 
There are a notable number of Sayyids in Tamil Nadu that mostly concentrate in the cities like Erwadi, Nagore, Madurai, and Kayalpattinam. Badusha Sulthan Syed Ibrahim Shaheed of Ervadi, a Hussaini descendant of Mohammed and a ruler of Madinah, travelled to South India in the middle of the 12th century. His descendants who live in Ervadi with the clan name Levvai are from a single forefather and are Sayyids. The heirs of Shahul Hamid Abdul Qadir badusha of Nagore who live there and are called with clan name of Sahib or Saab or Saabu are Sayyids. Kazi Syed Tajuddin the son of Mufti Jamaluddin al Ma'abari who founded the Kazimar Big Mosque in the 13th century the first mosque in Madurai is a Hussaini descendant of Mohammed and hence belong to Syed family. Until recently, his descendants (Syeds-Qazis-Huqdars) lived in the same Kazimar Street locality in the center of Madurai city for over seven centuries and managed the Kazimar Big Mosque constructed by their forefather. Syed Tajuddin's younger son Kazi Alauddin lived in Kayalpattinam and his shrine is found there.

Genetic studies of Sayyids of the Indian sub-continent 

The authors of the study, the Y chromosomes of self-identified Syeds from the Indian sub-continent are no less diverse than those non-Syeds from the same regions, suggested that Syed status, rather than being strictly patrilineal, may have been passed through other routes.

The paper, "Y chromosomes of self-identified Syeds from the Indian subcontinent", by Elise M. S. Belle, Saima Shah, Tudor Parfitt, and Mark G. Thomas showed that "self-identified Syeds had no less genetic diversity than those non-Syeds from the same regions, suggesting that there is no biological basis to the belief that self-identified Syeds in this part of the world share a recent common ancestry. However, self-identified men belonging to the ‘Islamic honorific lineages’ (Syeds, Hashemites, Quraysh and Ansari) show a greater genetic affinity to Arab populations—despite the geographic distancethan do their neighbouring populations from South Asia.

In Northern India, 29 per cent of the Shia Muslim belong to haplogroup J. There are 18 per cent belonging mainly to haplogroup J2 and another 11 per cent belong to haplogroup J1, which both represent Middle Eastern lineages. J1 is exclusively Near Eastern.

Southeast Asia 
Most of the Alawi Sayyids who moved to Southeast Asia were descendants of Ali ibn Husayn Zayn al-Abidin, especially of Ba 'Alawi sada, many of which were descendants of migrants from Hadhramaut. Even though they are alleged descendants of Husayn, it is uncommon for the female Sayyids to be called Sayyidah; they are more commonly called Sharifah. Most of them live in Brunei, Indonesia, Malaysia, Singapore, Moro Province in Philippines, Pattani and Cambodia. Many of the royal families of this region such as the previous royal families of the Philippines (Sultanate of Sulu, Sultanate of Maguindanao, Confederation of Sultanates of Ranao), Singapore (Sultanate of Singapore), Malaysia (Sultanates of Johor and Perlis), Indonesia (Sultanates of Siak, Pontianak, Gowa, some Javanese Sultanates), and the existing royal family of Brunei (House of Bolkiah) are also Sayyids, especially of Ba'Alawi.

Some common surnames of these Sayyids are al-Saqqaf, Shihab (or Shahab), al-Aidaroos, al-Habsyi (or al-Habshi), al-Kaff, al-Aththos, al-Haddad, al-Jufri (or al-Jifri), al-Muhdhar, al-Shaikh Abubakar, al-Qadri, al-Munawwar.

Tesayyud 
In the Ottoman Empire, tax breaks for "the People of the House" encouraged many people to buy certificates of descent or forge genealogies; the phenomenon of teseyyüd – falsely claiming noble ancestry – spread across ethnic, class, and religious boundaries. In the 17th century, an Ottoman bureaucrat estimated that there were 300,000 impostors. In 18th-century Anatolia, nearly all upper-class urban people claimed descent from Muhammad.

Royal Sayyids 
Descendants of Muhammad are present in many royal families today and are predominantly of Sunni faith.

Afghan Royal Family 
Within the Afghan Royal family Her Royal Highness Princess Sayyida Rahima Dakik (d.2006) a member of Sayyid Mir Jan´s powerful Sayyid ul Sadaat Clan, married the UN Ambassador and Minister HRH Prince Abdul Khaliq from the Muhammadzai Dynasty, making both their descendants the only Sayyids within the Afghan Royal family. Dakik Family fled from Afghanistan on the occasion of the Saur Revolution and are the only Sunni Royal Sayyids that are venerated as Saints.

Iranian Royal Family 
Within the Qajar Dynasty, the Nizari-Ismaili Imam Agha Khan I married with the daughter of Fath Ali Shah Qajar, bestowing confirmed royalty upon their descendants. Until today Prince Karim Aga Khan and his descendants bear the title Prince, in virtue of his lineage to Fath Ali Shah Qajar.

GCC Royal families

UAE 
The Al Qasimi Ruling family that rules over Sharjah and Ras al Khaimah trace their lineage back to Muhammad in the line of the 10th Imam Ali al Hadi.

Qatar 
Within the Qatari Ruling Family, descendants of Muhammad are present within the descendants of the Emir Sheikh Ali ibn Abdullah al Thani on the occasion of intermarriages with the Al Qasimi Dynasty. A UAE Princess from the al Qasimi ruling family, called Sheikha Sheikha bint Muhammad al Qasimi married with Muhammad bin Ali bin Abdullah Al Thani. Together they issued only two sons, one of whom is a Qatari-Sharjan Aviation Statesman called Sheikh Abdullah bin Mohamed and his younger brother, who is the well known artist Sheikh Hasan ibn Muhammad al Thani, regarded as a pioneer of Middle Eastern modern arts. Another UAE Princess called Sheikha Hind bint Faisal Al Qasimi married Sheikh Abdullah bin Saud al Thani, issuing only one son.

Sherifs of Mecca

Jordan 
The Hashemite Royal family of Jordan is also claiming descent from Muhammad in the line of the Sherifs of Mecca, vassals that were set by the Fatimids and recognized by the Ottomans, tracing their lineage back to Imam Hasan ibn Ali. The Hashemite Royal Family under Sharif Hussein ibn Ali was crucial in ending Ottoman rule in the Arabian Peninsula, on the occasion of the spread of Pan-Turkism in the Arabian Peninsula.

Brunei 
The House of Bolkiah claims descent from Imam Hasan ibn Ali through Sharif Ali, the 3rd Sultan of Brunei, who succeeded his father in law as Sultan in virtue of his descent from Muhammad. Sharif Ali formerly served as Emir of Makkah and belonged to the Sherifians, migrating to Brunei for missionary purposes.

Moroccan Royal family 
The Alaouite Royal family of Morocco is also claiming descent from Muhammad in the line of Imam Hasan ibn Ali. Their pratriarch was Sharif ibn Ali, who founded the dynasty.

Special requirements in Sunni Islam 
According to Iran's religious leader and the Deobandi creed—a creed especially followed by patriarchal Pashtun tribes—the status of being a Sayyid can only be attributed through patrilineal lineage. According to Shia opinions, children of a Sayyida mother and a non-Sayyid father are referred to as Mirza. The Persian notation "Mirza", which is a derivation of the word "Mirzada" (i.e., Son of a "Mir") has various meanings: one is a Sayyid leader of a Sayyid branch or community, simultaneously being a religious Islamic scholar. Thus, a Sayyid of patrilineal lineage, being the son of a Mir, can also be called "Mirza". This example substantiates the fact that there are different opinions concerning the transmission of the title Sayyid. Another historical opinion of Ottoman Naqib al Ashrafs expresses that children of maternal prophetical descent are called Sharif.

However, in 1632 when an Ottoman court challenged a man wearing a Sayyid green turban, he established that he was a Sayyid on his mother's side, which was accepted by the court.

In patriarchal societies, women usually have to assimilate themselves into their husband's status. However, this does not affect female descendants of Muhammad as it is seen as a sacred blood relation. Thus, the heraldic title can be given to an individual through his or hers mother's line in accordance to Ottoman Naqib al-Ashrafs. Even the Zaynabids, the descendants of Lady Zainab, the daughter of Ali ibn Abi Talib can also be titled Sayyid or Sharif, according to the Egyptian Al-Suyuti. In Tajikistan matrilineal descendants are honoured.

It is to be added that the supervision over the family of Bahauddin Naqshband and his descendants has been passed on through the maternal line. Hazrat Ishaan was a maternal descendant of Bahauddin Naqshband and his successor Sayyid Mir Jan was in turn again a descendant of Hazrat Ishaan from his mother's side.

This indicates the possibility of even being a Mir or Naqib ul Ashraf from the mother's side.

The requisites of it are the following:
 Being able to trace his lineage back to Muhammad as ancestor
 Being a Pious Muslim
 Receiving the blessings of previous Naqib ul Ashraf, Mir or Sayyid ul Sadaat
 Total affiliation as an Alid, meaning a son of Ali Ibn Abi Talib, hence neglecting any other affiliations
 Being learned in the Quran and the Sunnah
 Being a knowledgeable practicing Sufi 
 Noble and well-mannered character
 For a Mir especially, being qualified as a leader

The above remuneration is in accordance with a hadith of Muhammad in which he declares that a hypocrite is not to be addressed as a "Sayyid". Hence it is even problematic in a judicial point of view to call a patrilineal descendant of Ali Ibn Abi Talib a Sayyid, when he does not meet the above-mentioned criteria.

See also 
 Family tree of Muhammad
Kohen, a similar status in Judaism
Sayyid Sultan Masood Dakik, well known Sayyid from the Afghan Royal Family
Bannu District

Notes

References

Sources

Arabic words and phrases
Fatimah
Hashemite people
Islamic terminology
Islamic honorifics

Descendants of individuals